Eric Salter Balfour (born April 24, 1977) is an American actor and singer. He is the lead singer of Born as Ghosts, formerly known as Fredalba. He made his film debut in the drama Shattered Image (1998), followed by roles in What Women Want (2000) and The Texas Chainsaw Massacre (2003). His roles on television include Milo Pressman on the action-thriller TV series 24, a recurring role in the HBO drama Six Feet Under as Gabriel Dimas, Duke Crocker in  Haven, Eddie on The OC, and as Boone in Country Comfort.

Early life
Balfour was born to a Jewish family in Los Angeles, California, the son of David Balfour, a chiropractor, and Sharon (née Salter), who works as a marriage and family counselor. He has a younger sister, Tori.

He described his household growing up as "creative" and said that his family often made trips to the Esalen Institute in Big Sur.

Career
Balfour appeared on the kids TV show Kids Incorporated for one season in 1991. During the early 1990s, he had a variety of minor juvenile roles on television series such as Dr. Quinn, Medicine Woman, Arresting Behavior, Boy Meets World and Step by Step. In 1997, he appeared in the first two episodes of Buffy the Vampire Slayer as Jesse McNally, one of the show's first victims. Eric was a regular on the HBO series Six Feet Under as Gabriel Dimas in 2001.  He appeared as a regular cast member in three short-lived TV shows. Veritas: The Quest was cancelled after four episodes in 2003, Hawaii was canceled after seven episodes in 2004, and Sex, Love & Secrets was canceled after four episodes. Also in 2005, Balfour starred in the sexually explicit Canadian drama Lie with Me opposite Lauren Lee Smith. In March 2006, Balfour debuted as Brian Peluso on producer Dick Wolf's short-lived NBC crime drama, Conviction, which lasted one season. Balfour was also a guest star on the hit show Dawson's Creek in the ninth episode of the first season.

He starred in the 2003 remake of The Texas Chainsaw Massacre opposite Jessica Biel. He played a minor character in several episodes of The O.C. as Eddie, Theresa's fiancé, and in the hit HBO show Six Feet Under as Gabriel Dimas, Claire Fisher's boyfriend.

Balfour appeared in seven episodes of the first season of 24 as computer technician Milo Pressman in 2001. Five years later, Balfour reprised the role for 19 episodes of 24'''s sixth season before leaving the show by his own request. Balfour appeared in Life on Mars as Eddie Carling, the brother of detective Ray Carling.

He was the face for the Valentino male fragrance Valentino V. In September 2009, Balfour appeared in an episode of Monk. In the same month, Balfour booked a recurring role on the drama show The Beautiful Life, but the show was canceled after its second episode and production was shut down immediately. In 2010, he starred in the Strause Brothers thriller film Skyline. He starred as Duke Crocker on the Syfy drama Haven. Balfour co-starred with Missy Peregrym and Jeff Roop in the survival film Backcountry, and he appeared as Spiro Dalon in an episode of Chicago P.D.''

Personal life
After five years of dating, Balfour married fashion designer Erin Chiamulon on May 30, 2015 in Pacific Palisades, California. Balfour and his wife had a son on August 2, 2018. In May 2022, Balfour and his wife welcomed their second son.

Filmography

References

External links

1977 births
American male child actors
American male film actors
American male television actors
Jewish American male actors
Living people
Male actors from Los Angeles
20th-century American male actors
21st-century American male actors
21st-century American male singers
21st-century American singers
21st-century American Jews